The Duck Lake Station Site is a former way station on the Overland Trail in Carbon County, Wyoming. Built in 1862, the site is located between the Dug Springs Station to the west and the Washakie Station to the east. The Duck Lake station was a more basic one-room building. All that remains of the station are its foundations. The site was placed on the National Register of Historic Places on December 6, 1978.

References

External links
 Duck Lake Station Site at the Wyoming State Historic Preservation Office

National Register of Historic Places in Carbon County, Wyoming
Overland Trail
Stagecoach stations on the National Register of Historic Places in Wyoming